Clifford Frederick Bourland (January 1, 1921 – February 1, 2018) was an American athlete who won a gold medal in the 4 × 400 m relay at the 1948 Summer Olympics.

Born in Los Angeles, California, of a German mother and an American father, Bourland ran in a competition for the first time in 1932. Graduating from Venice High School in Los Angeles, Bourland enrolled to University of Southern California and was coached by the famous Dean Cromwell. Bourland won the AAU championships in 400 m and the NCAA championships in 440 yd in 1942 and 1943. During the World War II, Bourland served in the Navy as a captain of a landing craft tank. At the London Olympics, Bourland was fifth in 200 m and won the gold medal as a member of American 4 × 400 m relay team, running the second leg in 47.3 seconds.

After the Olympics, Bourland retired from sports. After a failed attempt to start a career in municipal politics, he was hired by an insurance company. In 1984 he was a part owner of the mortgage banking firm called Norris, Biggs and Simpson.

Competition record

References

External links 
 
 
 

1921 births
2018 deaths
American male sprinters
Athletes (track and field) at the 1948 Summer Olympics
Olympic gold medalists for the United States in track and field
Businesspeople from Los Angeles
USC Trojans men's track and field athletes
University of Southern California alumni
Track and field athletes from Los Angeles
Medalists at the 1948 Summer Olympics
Deaths from pneumonia in California
Venice High School (Los Angeles) alumni
20th-century American businesspeople
United States Navy personnel of World War II
United States Navy officers